Shower gel (also shower cream or body wash) is a specialized liquid product used for cleaning the body during showers. Not to be confused with liquid soaps, shower gels, in fact, do not contain saponified oil. Instead, it uses synthetic detergents derived from either petroleum or plant sources.

Body washes and shower gels have a lower pH value than the traditional soap, which is also known to feel less drying to the skin. In certain cases, sodium stearate is added to the chemical combination to create a solid version of the shower gel.

History 
Shower gel is a derivative invention of the liquid soap, which first appeared in the 1800s. In 1865, William Shepphard patented the formula behind the liquid soap, but the product gained eventual popularity with the rise of Palmolive soap in 1898, by B.J. Johnson.

Modern chemistry later enabled the creation of the shower gel, which specialized in cleaning the entire body during baths and showers.

Properties 

Shower gels are known to consist of the same basic ingredients as soap - water, betaines, and sodium laureth sulfate, or SLS. But the main difference between the two products lie in its surfactants - compounds known to lower the surface tension between substances, which helps in the emulsification and the washing away of oily dirt. The surfactants of shower gels do not come from saponification, that is by reacting a type of oil or fat with lye. Instead, it uses synthetic detergents for surfactants derived from either plant-based sources or petroleum. This gives the product a lower pH value than soap and might also feel less drying to the skin. Some people have likened the effect to feeling less squeaky clean, however. 

Surfactants can make up as much as 50 percent of the shower gel content, with the remaining proportion being made up of a combination of water and ingredients to thicken, preserve, emulsify, add fragrance, and color. Multiple surfactants are often used to achieve desired product qualities. A primary surfactant can provide good foaming ability and cleaning effectiveness, while a secondary surfactant can add qualities of mildness to prevent irritation or over-drying of the skin. To prevent shower gel ingredients from separating, emulsifiers such as diethanolamine are added. Conditioning agents may also be added to moisturize the skin during and after product use. They are also available in different colours and scents. Ingredients, like scent in the form of essential oils or fragrance oils and colorant in the form of water soluble dyes are common in shower gels. 

Microbeads were commonly used in shower gels until recently. Microbeads are tiny spheres of plastic that were added to a variety of cosmetic products for their exfoliating qualities. They are too small to filter out of water systems and end up in waterways and oceans, potentially passing toxins to animal life and humans. Following the legislative actions of other countries, the United States passed the Microbead-Free Waters Act in 2015, which bans microbeads in the U.S. incrementally starting in 2017, with full implementation set for 2019. It has been banned from production and use in cosmetics in the U.S. since July 1, 2017. In the UK - since October 1, 2018.

Shower gels for men may contain the ingredient menthol, which gives a cooling and stimulating sensation on the skin, and some men's shower gels are also designed specifically for use on hair and body. Shower gels contain milder surfactant bases than shampoos, and some also contain gentle conditioning agents in the formula. This means that shower gels can also double as an effective and perfectly acceptable substitute to shampoo, even if they are not labelled as a hair and body wash. Washing hair with shower gel should give approximately the same result as using a moisturising shampoo.

Marketing 

Like shampoo and bubble bath products, many are marketed directly towards children. These often feature scents intended to appeal to children, such as fruit scents, or cookies or cotton candy scents. Many bottles feature popular characters from children's television or movies. As with men's body wash, they often are specifically designed to be used also as a shampoo and conditioner. They also often contain gentle ingredients designed for young skin.

References

Further reading

 

Bathing
Personal hygiene products